Eleventeen may refer to:

Eleventeen (EP), 1996 EP by Eve 6
Eleventeen (album), 1992 Album by Daisy Chainsaw
Eleventeen, 2021 album by Lee Kerslake
"Eleventeen", song from the album I'm Sorry That Sometimes I'm Mean by Kimya Dawson